The 2015–16 season is Omonia's 61st season in the Cypriot First Division and 67th year in existence as a football club.

Current squad

On loan

 

Source: omonoia.com.cy

Active internationals

Foreign players

Squad changes

Squad stats

Top scorers

Last updated: 27 April 2016
Source: Match reports in Competitive matches, omonoia.com.cy

Captains
 Nuno Assis
 Renato João Inácio Margaça
 André Schembri

Pre-season and friendlies

Competitions

Overall

Cypriot First Division

Classification

Results summary

Results by round

Matches

Regular season

Play-offs table

Group A

Results

UEFA Europa League

First qualifying round

Second qualifying round

Third qualifying round

Cypriot Cup

First round

Second round

Quarter-finals

Semi-finals

Final

References

AC Omonia seasons
Omonia